The American emerald (Cordulia shurtleffii) is a species of dragonfly found in North America. It is colored mostly black with a yellow ring between segments 2 and 3.

References

External links
Cordulia shurtleffii, Discover Life
American Emerald, image
American Emerald, NJodes

Corduliidae
Odonata of North America
Insects described in 1866